The 2022 Christus Health Pro Challenge was a professional tennis tournament played on outdoor hard courts. It was the sixth edition of the tournament which was part of the 2022 ITF Women's World Tennis Tour. It took place in Tyler, Texas, United States between 24 and 30 October 2022.

Champions

Singles

  Taylor Townsend def.  Yuan Yue, 6–4, 6–2

Doubles

  Maria Kozyreva /  Ashley Lahey def.  Jaeda Daniel /  Nell Miller, 7–5, 6–2

Singles main draw entrants

Seeds

 1 Rankings are as of 17 October 2022.

Other entrants
The following players received wildcards into the singles main draw:
  Hina Inoue
  Sofia Kenin
  Maria Mateas
  Alana Smith

The following player received entry into the singles main draw using a protected ranking:
  Emiliana Arango

The following players received entry from the qualifying draw:
  Alexis Blokhina
  Katarina Kozarov
  Maria Kozyreva
  Ellen Perez
  Abigail Rencheli
  Malaika Rapolu
  Alexandra Vecic
  Allura Zamarripa

References

External links
 2022 Christus Health Pro Challenge at ITFtennis.com
 Official website

2022 ITF Women's World Tennis Tour
2022 in American tennis
October 2022 sports events in the United States